Alfred Sheath (15 June 1859 – 1939) was an English cricketer. He played in one first-class match in New Zealand for Canterbury in 1879/80.

See also
 List of Canterbury representative cricketers

References

External links
 

1859 births
1939 deaths
English cricketers
Canterbury cricketers
Cricketers from Birmingham, West Midlands